The 1968 Nippon Professional Baseball season was the 19th season of operation of Nippon Professional Baseball (NPB).

Regular season

Standings

League leaders

Central League

Pacific League

Awards
Most Valuable Player
Shigeo Nagashima, Yomiuri Giants (CL)
Tetsuya Yoneda, Hankyu Braves (PL)
Rookie of the Year
Shigeru Takada, Yomiuri Giants (CL)
No PL recipient
Eiji Sawamura Award
Yutaka Enatsu, Hanshin Tigers (CL)

See also
1968 Major League Baseball season

References